Theridion teliferum, is a species of spider of the genus Theridion. It is endemic to Sri Lanka.

See also 
 List of Theridiidae species

References 

Theridiidae
Endemic fauna of Sri Lanka
Spiders of Asia
Spiders described in 1895